Victor Pilon,  (born on March 19, 1958) is a director, theatre designer, visual designer and photographer from Quebec, Canada.

Life and career 

After a two-year stay in Europe, Victor Pilon enrolled in visual arts at the University of Ottawa. In 1983, after receiving his bachelor's degree with a specialization in photography, he moved to Montreal. He founded the company Lemieux Pilon 4D Art with Michel Lemieux in 1990. Since then, they have worked together to create a plethora of multimedia productions, including La Belle et la Bête (2011), NORMAN (2007), La Tempête (2005) and Anima (2002), all of which have toured internationally.

In 2003, Pilon and Lemieux did the visual design for the television show The Planets, based on the music of Gustav Holst, presented on both the French and English networks of the Canadian Broadcasting Corporation (CBC). They also created many large-scale events such as Harmony 2000, a show created to celebrate the beginning of the new millennium, and Soleil de Minuit, the closing performance of Montreal International Jazz Festival 2004 (MIJF), commemorating, respectively, the 20th and 25th anniversaries of Cirque du Soleil and the MIJF. They were also behind Cirque du Soleil's DELIRIUM. With over fifty artists onstage, this multimedia production revisited the music of Cirque du Soleil's past productions. In 2008, they directed Starmania, the famous show by Luc Plamondon and Michel Berger. It was the first time this musical was produced as an opera.

As official photographer for the British royal family when in Canada, Pilon has covered more than 30 of their visits. Working for the Government of Quebec and Government of Canada, he has also photographed various other heads of state during their official visits.

Creations in collaboration with Michel Lemieux

Shows 
 2014 – ICARUS
 2011 – La Belle et la Bête
 2008 – Starmania The Opera
 2007 – NORMAN
 2006 – DELIRIUM
 2005 – La Tempête
 2003 – The Planets
 2002 – Anima
 1998 – Orféo
 1996 – Pôles
 1994 – Grand Hôtel des Étrangers
 1992 – Têtes Chercheuses
 1992 – Naïf, by Michel Rivard
 1990 – Free Fall

Installations 
 2014 – Dreamscapes – 30 Years of Innovative Performances at the Montreal Museum of Fine Arts
 2013 – Continuum – Planetarium Rio Tinto and Espace pour la vie
 2000 – Translucide
 1999 – Ocean of Hope
 1997 – Time Travel
 1995 – Reach for the Stars
 1994 – Territoire Intérieur / À mille lieux
 1993 – Act of Faith

Special events 
 2004 – Soleil de minuit
 2000 – This Is a Sphere
 1999 – Harmony 2000
 1995 – L'ADISQ
 1995 – Hommage à la musique du Cirque du Soleil – Montreal International Jazz Festival
 1992 – Uzeb farewell – Montreal International Jazz Festival
 1992 – La Nuit de Montréal / Night parade
 1991 – In Mid Air

Honours, awards and nominations 
 2014 – Knight, National Order of Quebec
 2013 – Officer, Order of Canada
 2011 – Gascon-Roux Award for best direction, set and lighting, LA BELLE ET LA BÊTE
 2010 – Journal de Montréal ranked DELIRIUM and STARMANIA: THE OPERA among the best 10 shows of the decade
 2008 – The Argus newspaper’s Angel Award for artistic excellence (Britain), NORMAN
 2007 – Nomination for the Conseil des arts de Montréal’s Grand Prize, NORMAN.
 2005 – Masque for special contribution of the multimedia concept, Académie québécoise du théâtre, THE TEMPEST.
 2005 – Gascon-Roux Award for best direction, lighting and sound design, THE TEMPEST.
 2005 – Technical award, Canadian Institute for Theatre Technology, THE TEMPEST.
 2004 – Félix nomination for best soundtrack, ANIMA.
 2000 – Winner of the competition to integrate arts with the architecture and environment of Montreal’s new conference centre.
 2000 – Masque nomination, special contribution of the virtual and stage projections, ORFÉO.
 1998 – Grafika Award, www.4dart.com website design.
 1992 – Félix Award for best direction, for Michel Rivard’s show NAÏF.
 1990 – Félix nomination for best direction, VOIX DE PASSAGE.
 1985 – Winner of four Félix awards for best show of the year, best lighting design, stage manager of the year and director of the year, SOLIDE SALAD. 	Seven other Félix nominations, SOLIDE SALAD.

References 

1.
2.
3.
4.
5.

External link 

•	Damoh

Canadian theatre directors
French Quebecers
Living people
Officers of the Order of Canada
Knights of the National Order of Quebec
Recipients of the Royal Victorian Medal
1958 births